Sixshooter, Texas is an unincorporated area in southeastern Pecos County, Texas.  It gets its name from the Sixshooter Draw, a tributary of the Monument Draw.  Sixshooter has a telephone exchange in Area code 432.

References
 

Unincorporated communities in Texas
Unincorporated communities in Pecos County, Texas